Michael John Hare, 2nd Viscount Blakenham (25 January 1938 – 8 January 2018), was a British hereditary peer and environmentalist.

He was the son of Conservative politician and government minister John Hare, 1st Viscount Blakenham and Hon. Beryl Nancy Pearson, daughter of Harold Pearson, 2nd Viscount Cowdray.

After some time working for partly or wholly owned subsidiaries, he joined the senior management of Pearson PLC (founded by his mother's ancestors) in 1977, and was managing director from 1978 to 1983, chief executive from 1978 to 1993, and chairman from 1983 to 1997. He also was Chief Executive (1983–93) and Chairman (1984–93) of the Financial Times, then a Pearson subsidiary.

A lifelong environmentalist, Blakenham was chairman of the Royal Botanical Gardens at Kew Gardens as well as Council Chairman of the Royal Society for the Protection of Birds between 1982 and 1986 and president of Sussex Wildlife Trust from between 1983 and 1987. He continued to develop the Blakenham Woodland Garden, which was created by his father. He also owned the island of Little Colonsay in the Inner Hebrides.

Blakenham lived in Suffolk and led the local political party Suffolk Together. He represented the party as a member of Mid Suffolk District Council from 2007 to 2015 under the name Michael Blakenham. During the 2014 European Parliament election he endorsed Rupert Read, lead candidate on the Green list in the East of England constituency.

Through his sister, Joanna Freda Hare, he was a brother-in-law of U.S. Supreme Court Justice Stephen Breyer.

Family

In January 1965 he married his 18-year-old first cousin, Marcia Persephone Hare
(her father, his father's brother the Hon Alan Hare (1919–1995), preceded him as head of the Financial Times).
Lord and Lady Blakenham had a son and two daughters:
 His son and successor, Caspar John Hare, 3rd Viscount Blakenham (born 1972), a philosophy professor at the Massachusetts Institute of Technology. married Melissa Mohr and has two children:
Thomasina
Inigo 
 author Cressida Cowell (born 1966), married Simon John Cowell and has 3 children:
Maisie
Clementine
Alexander 
 artist Emily Faccini (born 1967), married Ben Faccini and has 3 children:
Francesco
Delfina
Bay

He died in January 2018 at the age of 79.

External links

References

1938 births
2018 deaths
Viscounts in the Peerage of the United Kingdom
People from Mid Suffolk District
Royal Society for the Protection of Birds people
Financial Times people
Michael
Blakenham